Louis-François-Philippe Drouet (14 April 1792 – 30 September 1873) was a 19th-century French flautist and composer.

Biography 
Born of a French father expatriated in the Netherlands and barber by profession, Louis Drouet began learning to play the flute as a self-taught man before entering the Conservatoire de Paris at the age of seven.

At 16, he was first flutist and teacher of Louis Bonaparte, Napoléon's brother, and King of Holland. After touring trips to England, the United States and Europe, in 1840 he became director of music by the Duke of Saxe-Cobourg-Gotha.

Drouet was a great friend of Felix Mendelssohn. He was often referred to as the "Paganini of flute".

Works 
The musicologist Arthur Pougin wanted to attribute to Louis Drouet (apparently wrongly) the melody of the unofficial hymn of the Second French Empire, Partant pour la Syrie, although considered as having been composed by Hortense de Beauharnais, Queen of Holland from 1806 to 1810, and Napoléon  III's mother.

Compositions 
 10 concertos
 more than 20 duets, trios, solos and fantasies
 more than 300 studies
Pedagogic method
 Méthode pour la flûte, ou Traité complet et raisonné pour apprendre à jouer de cet instrument, Paris : A. J. Pleyel et fils aîné, 1828, Mayence & Anvers : B. Schott, 1829 translation into English under the title Drouët's Method of Flute Playing, London: R. Cocks, 1830 reissued in French by Arlette Biget and Michel Giboureau in  Flûte traversière : méthodes, traités, périodiques, vol. III, Courlay : J. M. Fuzeau, 2005.

References

Bibliography 
     
 András Adorján, Lenz Meierott (Hrsg.): Lexikon der Flöte, Laaber-Verl., Laaber 2009,

External links 
 Biography on La flûte traversière
 Drouet, Louis François Philippe on IMSLP
  Louis Drouet on flutiste.com
 Biography of Louis Drouet (1792-1873) on flutepage.de
  Louis Drouet biography on giorgioproductions.com

French classical flautists
Flute makers
French composers
Conservatoire de Paris alumni
1792 births
Musicians from Amsterdam
1873 deaths